Lynchburg (also known as Lynch's Ferry) is an unincorporated community in east central Harris County, Texas, United States.

History
In 1822, Nathaniel Lynch built a ferry to cross the San Jacinto River at the confluence of Buffalo Bayou claiming a landmark better known as Juan Seguin Historic Park. The ferry connected what would become the community of Lynchburg, on the east side of the crossing with the road to Harrisburg.  At the western landing is the location of the San Jacinto Battlefield where Texan forces under Sam Houston defeated Antonio López de Santa Anna's Mexican forces in 1836.

Education
Deer Park Independent School District operates schools in the area.
Zoned schools include:
Deer Park Elementary School
Deer Park Junior High School
Deer Park High School

References

External links

Unincorporated communities in Harris County, Texas
Unincorporated communities in Texas
Greater Houston